Irwin Cotler  (born May 8, 1940) is a retired Canadian politician who was Member of Parliament for Mount Royal from 1999 to 2015. He served as the Minister of Justice and Attorney General of Canada from 2003 until the Liberal government of Paul Martin lost power following the 2006 federal election.  He was first elected to the House of Commons of Canada in a by-election in November 1999, winning 92% of votes cast.

Early life
The son of a lawyer, Cotler was born in Montreal, Quebec to a Jewish family.

Cotler received his B.A. (1961) and BCL (1964) degree from McGill University and was an editor of the McGill Law Journal. He then graduated from  Yale Law School with an LL.M.  For a short period, he worked with federal Minister of Justice John Turner. 

Cotler was a professor of law at McGill University and the director of its Human Rights Program from 1973 until his election as a Member of Parliament in 1999 for the Liberal Party of Canada. He has also been a visiting professor at Harvard Law School, a Woodrow Wilson Fellow at Yale Law School and is the recipient of eleven honorary doctorates.  He was appointed in 1992 as an Officer of the Order of Canada. He is a past president of the Canadian Jewish Congress. He received an honorary doctorate from McGill University on May 30, 2019, and gave the commencement address during the Faculty of Law's convocation ceremony.

Human rights activity
Cotler has served on the Standing Committee on Foreign Affairs and its sub-Committee on Human Rights and International Development, as well as on the Standing Committee on Justice and Human Rights. In 2000, he was appointed special advisor to the Minister of Foreign Affairs on the International Criminal Court.

As an international human rights lawyer, Cotler served as counsel to former prisoners of conscience Nelson Mandela in South Africa, Jacobo Timmerman in Latin America, Muchtar Pakpahan in Asia, as well as other well known political prisoners and dissidents. Cotler represented Natan Sharansky, who was imprisoned in the Soviet gulag for Jewish activism. After his release, Sharansky went on to become Israeli Deputy Prime Minister.

At the request of Nelson Mandela's South African legal team, Cotler took on the role of "Canadian counsel" to Mandela in 1981, participating in anti-apartheid activities in Canada and advocating on Mandela's behalf.

Saad Eddin Ibrahim, an Egyptian democracy activist imprisoned by the Egyptian government, was represented by Cotler and acquitted in 2003. He acted as counsel to Maher Arar during part of Arar's imprisonment and supported demands for a public inquiry. He has also defended both Palestinians and Israelis against their own governments, and participated in a minor role in the Camp David peace agreement between Israel and Egypt.

In 1986 he was chief counsel to the Canadian Jewish Congress at the Deschênes Commission of Inquiry on War Criminals.

In 2017, Cotler was asked to join a panel of independent international experts designated by Luis Almagro, the Secretary General of the Organization of American States, to determine whether there was reasonable ground to believe that crimes against humanity have been committed in Venezuela.

Cotler is on the Board of Advancing Human Rights (NGO). He is also a board member of the Israel Council on Foreign Relations.

National security and the law

As minister of Justice, Cotler presided over many legislative changes concerning national security. This included proposed changes to privacy legislation known as "Lawful Access" to give police and intelligence officers the tools to conduct surveillance of electronic communications for law enforcement and national security purposes.

In early 2005, Cotler intervened in the senate review of Canada's 2001 Anti-Terrorism Act, as mandated by section 145 of the bill. This law, adopted in the wake of the September 11 attacks, had been criticized by some human rights groups and defense lawyers, as an unreasonable trade-off between security and freedom. In his speech to the senate committee on the matter, Cotler rejected these concerns, arguing that "there is no contradiction in the protection of security and the protection of human rights".

Politics
On December 12, 2003, Prime Minister Paul Martin appointed him to Cabinet as Minister of Justice and Attorney General of Canada.

He recommended the appointment of two women to the Supreme Court of Canada: Louise Charron and Rosalie Abella.

Cotler attempted to introduce several bills to decriminalize marijuana.

On February 22, 2006, the Liberal Party appointed Cotler Critic for Public Safety and Emergency Preparedness in the opposition shadow cabinet for the 39th Canadian Parliament. On January 18, 2007, Cotler was appointed Critic for Human Rights by newly elected leader Stéphane Dion.

Cotler was re-elected to Parliament in the 2008 election to represent the Mount Royal riding in Quebec with 55% of the vote, In January 2009, Cotler was named Special Counsel on Human Rights and International Justice for the Liberal Party, under Michael Ignatieff, and subsequently Critic for Human Rights. He was re-elected again in the 2011 election. In the 2011 election, Cotler fended off a serious challenge from former city councillor Saulie Zajdel, a longtime Liberal supporter running as a Conservative who lost by only 2,500 votes. It was only the third time that the Liberals have been seriously threatened in Mount Royal since initially winning it in 1940, and the closest that a centre-right party has come to winning anywhere in Montreal since 1993. In May 2011, Cotler was named Justice and Human Rights Critic by interim Liberal leader Bob Rae . Cotler also chaired the Inter-Parliamentary Group for Human Rights in Iran, the Inter-Parliamentary Group of Justice for Sergei Magnitsky, and the All-Party Save Darfur Coalition.

In 2013, Cotler was chosen to represent the Liberal Party of Canada at the Funeral of Nelson Mandela in deference to the work he did for and with Nelson Mandela in fighting Apartheid. Party Leader Justin Trudeau gave up his seat for him.

On February 5, 2014, Cotler announced he was not running in the 42nd Canadian federal election. He said he would remain "active in public life, lecturing and writing on the issues of the day, advancing the causes of human rights and international justice, and advocating on behalf of political prisoners."

Cotler was one of thirteen Canadians banned from traveling to Russia under retaliatory sanctions imposed by Russian President Vladimir Putin in March 2014. He replied through his official Twitter feed, "I see my travel ban from Russia as a badge of honour, not a mark of exclusion."

Cotler is an advisory board member of United Against Nuclear Iran and the Counter Extremism Project.

Anti-discrimination work
As Minister of Justice, Cotler tabled Canada's first-ever National Justice Initiative Against Racism, in parallel with the government's National Action Plan Against Racism. Cotler has worked with a group of international jurists to indict Iranian President Ahmadinejad for incitement to genocide under the UN Charter and the Genocide Convention. Cotler chaired a commission called the "Responsibility to Prevent Coalition", which released a petition in 2009 entitled "The Danger of a Genocidal and Nuclear Iran: A Responsibility to Prevent Petition". The petition has been signed by Elie Wiesel, Former UN High Commissioner for Human Rights Louise Arbour, and the former Swedish Deputy Prime Minister Per Ahlmark, and historian Yehuda Bauer.

He separated six categories of anti-Semitism and found thirteen indices of discrimination against Jews that characterizes the "new anti-Jewishness".

Cotler is a member of MEMRI's Board of Advisors.

Cotler is an Honorary Member of the International Raoul Wallenberg Foundation.

Cotler serves as a member of the Advisory Board of the Genesis Prize Foundation. Cotler has spoken at the Geneva Summit for Human Rights and Democracy on several occasions. 

In 2016, Irwin Cotler drafted the "'Never Again' Declaration", which has been signed by justice ministers, parliamentarians, jurists, and Luis Moreno Ocampo, former International Criminal Court prosecutor.

Family
Cotler's wife, Ariela (née Ze'evi), is a native of Jerusalem and worked as a legislative assistant to Likud members of the Israeli Knesset from 1967-79.

His daughter, Michal Cotler-Wunsh, is an attorney and was a PhD candidate in law at the Hebrew University of Jerusalem. She became a Member of the Knesset for the Blue and White Party in the 23rd Knesset, June 2020.

References

External links

Official site
"Is the war on Iraq illegal?" – Article by Cotler in "The Globe and Mail" 21 March 2003
How'd They Vote?: Irwin Cotler's voting history and quotes
 
 

1940 births
Academics from Montreal
Activists from Montreal
Anglophone Quebec people
Attorneys General of Canada
Canadian Jewish Congress
Canadian human rights activists
Canadian legal scholars
Harvard Law School faculty
Jewish Canadian politicians
Lawyers from Montreal
Liberal Party of Canada MPs
Living people
Academic staff of the McGill University Faculty of Law
Members of the House of Commons of Canada from Quebec
Officers of the Order of Canada
People from Côte Saint-Luc
Politicians from Montreal
Yale Law School alumni
Yale University faculty
Members of the 27th Canadian Ministry
McGill University Faculty of Law alumni